State Highway 2 (RJ SH 2) is a State Highway in Rajasthan state of India that connects  Dausa district of Rajasthan with Kuchaman in Nagaur district of Rajasthan. The total length of RJ SH 10 is 210 km.

References
 State Highway

Dausa district
Transport in Jaipur district
Nagaur district
State Highways in Rajasthan